Dziurdziów  (Dziurdziv) is a village in the administrative district of Gmina Lesko, within Lesko County, Subcarpathian Voivodeship, in south-eastern Poland. 

It is not necessarily a large village, but the people that live there live in a spread-out area of single houses.

References

Villages in Lesko County